Eucalyptus cneorifolia, the Kangaroo Island narrow-leaf mallee, is a native tree of Kangaroo Island, South Australia.

Description
It mostly forms a dense canopy of thin dark green leaves that have conspicuous oil glands. The bark is fibrous, greyish-brown to dark-grey in colour with longitudinally fissured bark on the lower trunk and with smooth greyish bark above. Adult leaves have an alternate arrangement.
It flowers between December and April producing inflorescences with small white flowers. The flowers occur in umbels of 4 to 14 found at the axils of the leaves. The buds are usually more or less ellipsoid in shape with a conical or hemispherical-conical bud-cap. The fruits that form are hemispherical or hemispherical-globose in shape. The fruit disc is wide and flat or slightly raised with three or four needle-like exserted valves.

Taxonomy
The species was first formally described by the botanist Augustin Pyramus de Candolle in 1828 and published in Prodromus Systematis Naturalis Regni Vegetabilis. The species name cneorifolia is taken from the genus Cneorum and the Latin word 'folium' meaning a leaf, referring to the similarity of the leaves to those of the unrelated plant Cneorum tricoccum.

Distribution
The Kangaroo Island narrow-leaf mallee was originally endemic to eastern Kangaroo Island and has no closely related species. It is also found around Adelaide and Mount Lofty Ranges on the mainland but is vulnerable on the Fleurieu Peninsula. It grows well in well-drained soils over laterite or limestone as part of a dense mallee shrubland community.

Cultivation
It is grown in plantations for the production of cineole based eucalyptus oil.  On Kangaroo Island, there were over 100 stills for the production of eucalyptus oil from the narrow-leaf mallee, however, the distillation industry went into decline after the 1930s due to the greater profitability of sheep farming.  Today there is currently only one operating distillery on the island.

Gallery

References

External links
 Eucalyptus Oil Industry Revival, Landline, ABC. 

cneorifolia
Myrtales of Australia
Crops originating from Australia
Flora of Kangaroo Island
Plants described in 1828